Hang Tuah station, also known as BBCC - Hang Tuah station due to the new transit hub, is an interchange station in the Pudu district of Kuala Lumpur, Malaysia, between the Ampang and Sri Petaling Lines (formerly known as STAR) and the KL Monorail. Seamless physical and fare integration was achieved on 1 March 2012 when the "paid-up" or restricted areas of both the LRT and monorail stations, which previously operated as two separate stations, were linked up, allowing passengers to transfer without needing to buy new tickets for the first time since the monorail became operational in 2003.

Located right beside of Bukit Bintang City Centre (BBCC), the station is in the vicinity of the Methodist Boys School, Victoria Institution, Bukit Aman (Kuala Lumpur Contingent Police Headquarters) and Stadium Negara.

History

Hang Tuah LRT station
The LRT station was formed in 1996 with the completion of the Hang Tuah LRT station, a rapid transit station along a reused stretch of a long abandoned railway line, used by STAR (now Ampang Line) trains traveling along the Ampang-bound line or the Putra Heights-bound line. The station was one of the first 13 STAR rapid transit stations to open in the city, part of "Phase I" of "System I". The surface level station consists of two sheltered platforms connected to a sheltered ticketing concourse above, linked only via staircases, and exiting to Jalan Hang Tuah.

Hang Tuah KL Monorail station
The area saw the addition of the Hang Tuah KL Monorail station, a separate station that provides access to Kuala Lumpur Monorail (KL Monorail) services, with the opening of the line on 31 August 2003. The station, like virtually all other KL Monorail stations, is elevated and built over Jalan Hang Tuah, but was not initially directly integrated to the nearby existing LRT station until 2012. The station had two exits that lead to either side of the road, and is adjacent to and located northeast from the LRT station. The station is only accessible via stairways and escalators. The station's length is also longer in comparison to certain KL Monorail stations.

The Hang Tuah monorail station is one of four Kuala Lumpur Monorail stations that serves the Kuala Lumpur Golden Triangle locality, the other three being the Raja Chulan station, the Bukit Bintang station and the Imbi station. The station is also one of two KL Monorail stations that is designated as an interchange to and from the Ampang Line and Sri Petaling Line, the other being the Titiwangsa station.

Integrated Hang Tuah Station

The proximity of the monorail station with the LRT station meant both stations are designated in transit maps as interchange stations between the two lines, and is subsequently use heavily primarily to reach Bukit Bintang and surrounding areas via the monorail line from the Ampang Line and the Sri Petaling Line. Since 2013, the two stations have been physically linked so it is no longer required to exit one station or to use the public sidewalk outside the station to reach the other station or to change lines (monorail to LRT or vice versa).

Station structure
The platforms of the LRT station were significantly revamped and remodelled when the station was physically linked to the nearby monorail station in 2012. These platforms have also been lengthened to accommodate longer trains. The elevated KL Monorail's station is located northeast to the LRT station. The concourse of the stations are located at the street level and level 1 respectively.

Exits and Entrances
This station has three signed entrances. Two originally part of the Hang Tuah Monorail station and a common signed access to the main ticketing hall for all three rail services. A new entrance connecting the station complex to the Bukit Bintang City Centre transit hub has been built for the development.

Connection to MRT
Though not an interchange, Hang Tuah station is located close to the  Merdeka MRT station and is accessible by a 600-metre walk. Merdeka MRT station itself is integrated with  Plaza Rakyat LRT station.

Around the station
 Bukit Bintang City Centre (BBCC)
 Victoria Institution
 Al-Bukhari Foundation Mosque
 Merdeka 118 precinct
 118 Mall
 Kenanga Wholesale City

Notes

References

Ampang Line
Kuala Lumpur Monorail stations
Railway stations opened in 1996